Kankatodus is an extinct genus of prehistoric ray-finned fish.

See also

 Prehistoric fish
 List of prehistoric bony fish

References

Tetraodontiformes
Prehistoric ray-finned fish genera
Late Cretaceous fish
Paleocene fish
Late Cretaceous genus first appearances
Paleocene genus extinctions
Late Cretaceous fish of Asia
Paleocene fish of Asia